Mesobria is a genus of spiders in the family Liocranidae. It was first described in 1898 by Simon. , it contains only one species, Mesobria guttata, found on St. Vincent.

References

Liocranidae
Monotypic Araneomorphae genera
Spiders of the Caribbean